Joakim Mæhle Pedersen (born 20 May 1997) is a Danish professional footballer who plays as a full-back for  club Atalanta and the Denmark national team.

Club career

AaB
Born in Østervrå, Vendsyssel, Mæhle started playing football with local club Østervrå IF and moved to the AaB youth academy as a 12-year-old. At the age of 19, Mæhle was promoted into the first team squad on 10 June 2016 and also signed a full-time senior contract with AaB. He made his debut for AaB on 7 August 2016. He started on the bench, but replaced Thomas Enevoldsen in the 89th minute in a 2–1 victory against FC Nordsjælland in the Danish Superliga.

On 11 November 2016, Mæhle earned a new contract until 2020. In April 2017, AaB confirmed that they were in negotiations with a foreign club about Mæhle.

Genk
On 9 May 2017, AaB confirmed that they had sold Mæhle to Belgian club Racing Genk for an undisclosed fee, starting from 1 July 2017. He was signed to succeed right-back Timothy Castagne, who had moved to Atalanta. Mæhle made his debut for Genk on 29 July 2017 in the first league match of the season against Waasland-Beveren as a substitute for Amine Khammas. In his first season with the club, he was not a fixed starter, competing with Clinton Mata for his position. In his second season, after Mata's departure to Club Brugge, he won a permanent starting position. That season, Mæhle grew into a key player in the Genk starting eleven. At the end of the season, Genk won the Belgian championship.

On 11 September 2019, Mæhle extended his contract until June 2023.

Atalanta
Genk announced on 22 December 2020 that Mæhle had signed for Atalanta on a five-year contract for a fee of €10 million. His transfer was made official on 4 January 2021. He made his Serie A debut for Atalanta on 6 January in the club's 3–0 defeat of Parma. On 28 February, Mæhle provided an assist in Atalanta's 2–0 win over Sampdoria. Mæhle scored his first goal for Atalanta in a 6–2 Serie A victory over Udinese on 9 January 2022.

International career
Mæhle made his Denmark national team debut on 5 September 2020 in a Nations League game against Belgium; he substituted Martin Braithwaite in the 72nd minute of a 2–0 home loss. He scored his first international goal in a friendly against the Faroe Islands on 7 October 2020.

In June 2021, he was included in the national team's bid for 2020 UEFA Euro, where the team reached the semi-finals.

On 12 October 2021, Maehle scored the only goal as Denmark defeated Austria to secure a place at the World Cup in Qatar.

Career statistics

Club

International

Scores and results list Denmark's goal tally first, score column indicates score after each Mæhle goal.

Honours
Genk
Belgian First Division A: 2018–19

References

External links

Profile at the Atalanta B.C. website
 
 

Living people
1997 births
People from Frederikshavn Municipality
Association football fullbacks
Danish men's footballers
Denmark international footballers
Denmark under-21 international footballers
Denmark youth international footballers
Danish Superliga players
Belgian Pro League players
Serie A players
AaB Fodbold players
K.R.C. Genk players
Atalanta B.C. players
UEFA Euro 2020 players
2022 FIFA World Cup players
Danish expatriate men's footballers
Expatriate footballers in Belgium
Danish expatriate sportspeople in Belgium
Expatriate footballers in Italy
Danish expatriate sportspeople in Italy
Sportspeople from the North Jutland Region